= The People Profiles =

Documentary Youtube channel

YouTube information
- Channels: @PeopleProfiles; @dynasticprofiles
- Years active: 2018–present
- Genre: Documentary
- Subscribers: 1.64 million
- Views: 239,476,218

The People Profiles is a YouTube channel that produces long‑form biographical documentaries. The channel was created by Edwin Elliott in 2018 and is based in the United Kingdom and is a pioneer on YouTube in making independent feature length documentaries.
